Jason Robert Beverlin (born November 27, 1973) is an American baseball coach and former pitcher, who is the current pitching coach of the Coastal Carolina Chanticleers. He played college baseball at Western Carolina as well as in Major League Baseball (MLB) and Nippon Professional Baseball (NPB). He played one season in the United States and three seasons in Japan. He also served as the head coach of Bethune-Cookman Wildcats (2012–2017).

Playing career
Beverlin attended Western Carolina University, and in 1993 he played collegiate summer baseball with the Cotuit Kettleers of the Cape Cod Baseball League.

Beverlin was selected in the fourth round of the 1994 Major League Baseball draft by the Oakland Athletics. The next summer, he was traded to the New York Yankees along with Rubén Sierra in exchange for Danny Tartabull. He became a minor league free agent following the 2000 season and signed with the Anaheim Angels. After a single season in their farm system, he again became a free agent and signed with the Cleveland Indians.

In 2002, Beverlin made his Major League Baseball (MLB) debut.  That year he played with both the Cleveland Indians and Detroit Tigers. He spent three of the next four seasons pitching in Japan with the Yakult Swallows and Yokohama BayStars. In 2007, he briefly played for the Buffalo Bisons, the Triple-A affiliate of the Cleveland Indians.

Coaching career
Following his professional playing career, Beverlin became a college baseball coach.  Prior to the start of the 2008 season, he was named the pitching coach at Georgia Southern, where he coached from 2008 to 2009.  From 2010 to 2011, he was the pitching coach at Tennessee.

Prior to the start of the 2012 season, Beverlin was named the head coach at Bethune-Cookman.

Head coaching records
The following is a table of Beverlin's yearly records as an NCAA Division I head baseball coach.

References

External links

1973 births
Living people
Major League Baseball pitchers
Detroit Tigers players
Cleveland Indians players
Buffalo Bisons (minor league) players
Baseball players from Michigan
People from Ashtabula, Ohio
American expatriate baseball players in Japan
Yakult Swallows players
Yokohama BayStars players
Bethune–Cookman Wildcats baseball coaches
Georgia Southern Eagles baseball coaches
Tennessee Volunteers baseball coaches
Western Carolina Catamounts baseball players
Cotuit Kettleers players
Coastal Carolina Chanticleers baseball coaches
American expatriate baseball players in Australia